Orphanides is a surname. Notable people with the surname include:

 Andreas G. Orphanides (born 1955), Cypriot professor and university administrator
 Athanasios Orphanides (born 1962), Cypriot economist
 Panicos Orphanides (born 1961), Cypriot football manager
 Theodoros G. Orphanides (1817–1886), Greek botanist

See also
 Georgios Orphanidis (1859–1942), Greek sports shooter
 Orfanidis, surname

Greek-language surnames